Tunbridge Wells West DEMU Depot was a traction maintenance depot located in Tunbridge Wells, Kent, England. The depot was near Tunbridge Wells West station.

The depot code was TW.

History 
Before its closure in 1985, Class 205  and other DEMUs could be seen at the depot.

References 

 Railway depots in England
Rail transport in Kent